Bangladesh Jail is a law enforcement agency responsible for the management and security of jails in Bangladesh and is located in Dhaka, Bangladesh. Inspector General of Prison Brigadier General ASM Anisul Haque is head of the force.

The Bangladesh Jail manages 13 central jails and 55 district jails. The Department of Prison operates seven divisional prison and 68 prisons. Bangladesh Jail is under the Department of Prison which is under the Ministry of Home Affairs.

History
Bangladesh Jail traces its origins to a Criminal Ward established in 1788 by the East India Company. The company passed the Bengal Regulation III of 1818 for preventive detention. The company built more prisons in 1986 in Comilla, Dhaka, Jessore, and Rajshahi. The British Raj declared jail in Dhaka and Rajshahi to be the Dhaka Central Jail and Rajshahi Central Jail.

Bangladesh jail was established in 1971, after the Independence of Bangladesh. They operate 13 central jails and 55 districts jails in Bangladesh.

On 4 November 1975, four senior leaders of the Awami League were murdered in Dhaka Central Jail. The four were former President Syed Nazrul Islam, former prime ministers Tajuddin Ahmed and Muhammad Mansur Ali, and President of Awami League Abul Hasnat Muhammad Qamaruzzaman. On 4 November 1975, jailer Aminur Rahman took the four from their separate rooms and placed them in one room. Aminur told them an important representative of the Khondaker Mostaq Ahmad government would meet them. Five Army officers led by Moslemuddin were refused entry to the jail by the Deputy inspector general of prisons but were eventually allowed following the orders of President Khondaker Mostaq Ahmad. The army personnel marched into the jail and shot the four leaders in their jail cell killing all except Muhammad Mansur Ali. After hearing the groans and Muhammad Mansur Ali call for water one of the prison guards, Motaleb, went and informed the army team who had returned to the entrance of the jail. The team returned and bayoneted all four Awami League leaders in their jail cells. It is observed as Jail Killing Day in Bangladesh.

Inspector generals of jail

special unit
The Bangladesh jail has specialized units, they are:
Prisons intelligence Unit
Prisons Training Institute, Dhaka
Prisons I.C.T unit
Kara Academy, Rajshahi

References

Government agencies of Bangladesh
1973 establishments in Bangladesh
Organisations based in Dhaka
Prison-related organizations
Prisons in Bangladesh